Lycée Français de Delhi (LFD) is a French international school in Delhi, India. It serves levels maternelle (preschool) through lycée (senior high school).

References

External links
 Lycée Français de Delhi

International schools in Delhi
Delhi